Krasny Prospekt ("Red Avenue") is a station on the Leninskaya Line of the Novosibirsk Metro. It opened on January 7, 1986. This is a transfer station to Sibirskaya of the Dzerzhinskaya Line. The station is located under eponymous avenue between its intersections with Gogol Street and Krylov Street.

Krasny Prospekt has two lobbies. Two exits of the southern lobby (on Krylov Street) are built in the residential buildings. The northern lobby provides transfer to Sibirskaya. Notable locations nearby include Novosibirsk Central Market, city circus and Ascension Cathedral.

References 

Novosibirsk Metro stations
Railway stations in Russia opened in 1986
Tsentralny City District, Novosibirsk
Railway stations located underground in Russia